This article presents a list of the historical events and publications of Australian literature during 1944.

Events
 The Ern Malley literary hoax is conceived when Angry Penguins editor Max Harris publishes the poems of the fictitious poet Ern Malley in the Autumn 1944 edition of his magazine. The poems had been concocted in 1943 by Australian writers James McAuley and Harold Stewart.

Books 

 Bernard Cronin – The Shadows Mystery
 Zora Cross – This Hectic Age
 Zane Grey – Wilderness Trek: A Novel of Australia
 Nevil Shute – Pastoral
 Christina Stead – For Love Alone

Short stories 

 Alan Marshall – "Trees Can Speak"
 Katharine Susannah Prichard – Potch and Colour

Children's and Young Adult fiction 
 Peg Maltby
 Peg's Fairy Book
 Introducing Pip and Pepita

Poetry 

 Rosemary Dobson – In a Convex Mirror: Poems
 Geoffrey Dutton – Night Flight and Sunrise
 E. M. England – Queensland Days : Poems
 R. D. Fitzgerald – "The Face of the Waters"
Nora Kelly – 1940–1942
 Will Lawson – Bill the Whaler and Other Verse
 James McAuley – "The Blue Horses"
 Ern Malley – The Darkening Ecliptic
 Ian Mudie – Poets at War: An Anthology of Verse by Australian Servicemen
 Kenneth Slessor
 "Beach Burial"
 One Hundred Poems: 1919–1939
 Judith Wright
 "Bora Ring"
 "Brother and Sisters"
 "Bullocky"

Biography 

 James Devaney – Shaw Neilson
 Miles Franklin and Kate Baker – Joseph Furphy: The Legend of a Man and His Book
 Alan Marshall – These are My People

Awards and honours

Literary

Births 

A list, ordered by date of birth (and, if the date is either unspecified or repeated, ordered alphabetically by surname) of births in 1944 of Australian literary figures, authors of written works or literature-related individuals follows, including year of death.

 3 January – Blanche d'Alpuget, novelist and biographer
 20 January – Caroline Caddy, poet
 17 February – Robert Dessaix, novelist and journalist
25 March – Tim Thorne, poet (died 2021)
 22 April – Damien Broderick, novelist and journalist
 15 May – David Foster, novelist
 22 May – John Flanagan, novelist
 23 July – Alex Buzo, playwright (died 2006)
 16 August – Roberta Sykes, author and poet (died 2010)
 25 December – Ross Fitzgerald, novelist and historian
 29 December – Gerard Windsor, novelist

Unknown date
 Andrew Burke, poet
 Bruce Elder, journalist
 Morag Fraser, journalist and critic

Deaths 

A list, ordered by date of death (and, if the date is either unspecified or repeated, ordered alphabetically by surname) of deaths in 1944 of Australian literary figures, authors of written works or literature-related individuals follows, including year of birth.

 13 April – Ambrose Pratt, novelist (born 1874)
 5 June – Capel Boake, novelist (born 1889)
27 December – Agnes Littlejohn, poet and short story writer (born 1865)

See also 
 1944 in poetry
 List of years in literature
 List of years in Australian literature
1944 in literature
1943 in Australian literature
1944 in Australia
1945 in Australian literature

References

Literature
Australian literature by year
20th-century Australian literature
1944 in literature